John Lis may refer to:

 John B. Lis (1915–1985), American politician in the New York State Assembly
 John T. Lis, professor of molecular biology & genetics